United States non-interventionism primarily refers to the foreign policy that was eventually applied by the United States between the late 18th century and the first half of the 20th century whereby it sought to avoid alliances with other nations in order to prevent itself from being drawn into wars that were not related to the direct territorial self-defense of the United States. Neutrality and non-interventionism found support among elite and popular opinion in the United States, which varied depending on the international context and the country's interests. At times, the degree and nature of this policy was better known as isolationism, such as the interwar period.

Due to the start of the Cold War in the aftermath of World War II end and the rise of the United States as a global superpower, its traditional foreign policy turned towards American imperialism with diplomatic and military interventionism, engaging or somehow intervening in virtually any overseas armed conflict ever since, and concluding multiple bilateral and regional military alliances, chiefly the North Atlantic Treaty Organization. Non-interventionist policies have had continued support from some Americans even after World War II, mostly regarding specific armed conflicts like the Vietnam and Korean wars or the more recent Syrian Civil War.

Background

Robert Walpole, Britain's first Whig Prime Minister, proclaimed in 1723: "My politics are to keep free from all engagements as long as we possibly can." He emphasized economic advantage and rejected the idea of intervening in European affairs to maintain a balance of power.  Walpole's position was known to Americans. However, during the American Revolution, the Second Continental Congress debated about forming an alliance with France. It rejected non-interventionism when it was apparent that the American Revolutionary War could be won in no other manner than a military alliance with France, which Benjamin Franklin successfully negotiated in 1778.

After Britain and France went to war in 1792, George Washington declared neutrality, with unanimous support of his cabinet, after deciding that the treaty with France of 1778 did not apply.  Washington's Farewell Address of 1796 explicitly announced the policy of American non-interventionism:
The great rule of conduct for us, in regard to foreign nations, is in extending our commercial relations, to have with them as little political connection as possible. Europe has a set of primary interests, which to us have none, or a very remote relation. Hence she must be engaged in frequent controversies the causes of which are essentially foreign to our concerns. Hence, therefore, it must be unwise in us to implicate ourselves, by artificial ties, in the ordinary vicissitudes of her politics, or the ordinary combinations and collisions of her friendships or enmities.

No entangling alliances (19th century)

President Thomas Jefferson extended Washington's ideas about foreign policy in his March 4, 1801 inaugural address. Jefferson said that one of the "essential principles of our government" is that of "peace, commerce, and honest friendship with all nations, entangling alliances with none." He also stated that "Commerce with all nations, alliance with none", should be the motto of the United States.  Extending at times into isolationism, both Jefferson and Madison also practiced the boycotting of belligerent nations with the Embargo Act of 1807.

In 1823, President James Monroe articulated what would come to be known as the Monroe Doctrine, which some have interpreted as non-interventionist in intent: "In the wars of the European powers, in matters relating to themselves, we have never taken part, nor does it comport with our policy, so to do. It is only when our rights are invaded, or seriously menaced that we resent injuries, or make preparations for our defense." It was applied to Hawaii in 1842 in support of eventual annexation there, and to support U.S. expansion on the North American continent.

After Tsar Alexander II put down the 1863 January Uprising in Poland, French Emperor Napoleon III asked the United States to "join in a protest to the Tsar." Secretary of State William H. Seward declined, "defending 'our policy of non-intervention—straight, absolute, and peculiar as it may seem to other nations,'" and insisted that "[t]he American people must be content to recommend the cause of human progress by the wisdom with which they should exercise the powers of self-government, forbearing at all times, and in every way, from foreign alliances, intervention, and interference."

President Ulysses S. Grant attempted to annex the Dominican Republic in 1870, but failed to get the support of the Radical Republicans in the Senate. The United States' policy of non-intervention was wholly abandoned with the Spanish–American War, followed by the Philippine–American War from 1899 to 1902.

20th century non-interventionism

President Theodore Roosevelt's administration is credited with inciting the Panamanian Revolt against Colombia, completed November 1903, in order to secure construction rights for the Panama Canal (begun in 1904).

President Woodrow Wilson was able to navigate neutrality in World War I for about three years, and to win 1916 reelection with the slogan "He kept us out of war." The neutrality policy was supported by the tradition of shunning foreign entanglements, and by the large population of immigrants from Europe with divided loyalties in the conflict. America did enter the war in April 1917, however. Congress voted to declare war on Germany, 373 to 50 in the House of Representatives and 82 to 6 in the Senate. Technically the US joined the side of the Triple Entente only as an "associated power" fighting the same enemy, not as officially allied with the Entente.

A few months after the declaration of war, Wilson gave a speech to Congress outlining his aims for conclusion of the conflict, labeled the Fourteen Points. That American proclamation was less triumphalist than the stated aims of some other belligerents, and its final point proposed that a "general association of nations must be formed under specific covenants for the purpose of affording mutual guarantees of political independence and territorial integrity to great and small states alike." After the war, Wilson traveled to Europe and remained there for months to labor on the post-war treaty, longer than any previous Presidential sojourn outside the country. In that Treaty of Versailles, Wilson's "general association of nations" was formulated as the League of Nations.

Isolationism between the World Wars

In the wake of the First World War, the non-interventionist tendencies gained ascendancy. The Treaty of Versailles, and thus, United States' participation in the League of Nations, even with reservations, was rejected by the Senate in the final months of Wilson's presidency. 
Republican Senate leader Henry Cabot Lodge supported the Treaty with reservations to be sure Congress had final authority on sending the U.S. into war. Wilson and his Democratic supporters rejected the Lodge Reservations,

The strongest opposition to American entry into the League of Nations came from the Senate where a tight-knit faction known as the Irreconcilables, led by William Borah and George Norris, had great objections regarding the clauses of the treaty which compelled America to come to the defense of other nations.  Senator William Borah, of Idaho, declared that it would "purchase peace at the cost of any part of our [American] independence." Senator Hiram Johnson, of California, denounced the League of Nations as a "gigantic war trust."  While some of the sentiment was grounded in adherence to Constitutional principles, most of the sentiment bore a reassertion of nativist and inward-looking policy.

The United States acted independently to become a major player in the 1920s in international negotiations and treaties.  The Harding Administration achieved naval disarmament among the major powers through the Washington Naval Conference in 1921–22. The Dawes Plan refinanced war debts and helped restore prosperity to Germany. In August 1928, fifteen nations signed the Kellogg–Briand Pact, brainchild of American Secretary of State Frank Kellogg and French Foreign Minister Aristide Briand. This pact that was said to have outlawed war and showed the United States commitment to international peace had its semantic flaws. For example, it did not hold the United States to the conditions of any existing treaties, it still allowed European nations the right to self-defense, and it stated that if one nation broke the Pact, it would be up to the other signatories to enforce it. The Kellogg–Briand Pact was more of a sign of good intentions on the part of the US, rather than a legitimate step towards the sustenance of world peace.

The economic depression that ensued after the Crash of 1929, also continued to abet non-intervention. The attention of the country focused mostly on addressing the problems of the national economy. The rise of aggressive imperialist policies by Fascist Italy and the Empire of Japan led to conflicts such as the Italian conquest of Ethiopia and the Japanese invasion of Manchuria. These events led to ineffectual condemnations by the League of Nations. Official American response was muted. America also did not take sides in the brutal Spanish Civil War and withdrew its troops from Haiti with the inauguration of the Good Neighbor Policy in 1934.

Non-interventionism before entering World War II 

As Europe moved closer to war in the late 1930s, the United States Congress continued to demand American neutrality. Between 1936 and 1937, much to the dismay of President Franklin D. Roosevelt, Congress passed the Neutrality Acts. For example, in the final Neutrality Act, Americans could not sail on ships flying the flag of a belligerent nation or trade arms with warring nations. Such activities had played a role in American entrance into World War I.

On 1 September 1939, Germany invaded Poland, marking the start of World War II, and the United Kingdom and France subsequently declared war on Germany. In an address to the American people two days later, President Roosevelt assured the nation that he would do all he could to keep them out of war. However, his words showed his true goals. "When peace has been broken anywhere, the peace of all countries everywhere is in danger," Roosevelt said. Even though he was intent on neutrality as the official policy of the United States, he still echoed the dangers of staying out of this war. He also cautioned the American people to not let their wish to avoid war at all costs supersede the security of the nation.

The war in Europe split the American people into two camps: non-interventionists and interventionists. The two sides argued over America's involvement in this World War II. The basic principle of the interventionist argument was fear of German invasion. One of the rhetorical criticisms of interventionism was that it was driven by the so-called merchants of death - businesses who had profited from World War I lobbying for involvement in order to profit from another large war. By the summer of 1940, France suffered a stunning defeat by Germans, and Britain was the only democratic enemy of Germany. In a 1940 speech, Roosevelt argued, "Some, indeed, still hold to the now somewhat obvious delusion that we … can safely permit the United States to become a lone island … in a world dominated by the philosophy of force." 

A Life survey published in July found that in the summer of 1940, 67% of Americans believed that a German-Italian victory would endanger the United States, that if such an event occurred 88% supported "arm[ing] to the teeth at any expense to be prepared for any trouble", and that 71% favored "the immediate adoption of compulsory military training for all young men". The magazine wrote that the survey showed "the emergence of a majority attitude very different from that of six or even three months ago".

Ultimately, the ideological rift between the ideals of the United States and the goals of the fascist powers empowered the interventionist argument. Writer Archibald MacLeish asked, "How could we sit back as spectators of a war against ourselves?" In an address to the American people on December 29, 1940, President Roosevelt said, "the Axis not merely admits but proclaims that there can be no ultimate peace between their philosophy of government and our philosophy of government."

There were still many who held on to non-interventionism. Although a minority, they were well organized, and had a powerful presence in Congress. Pro-German or anti-British opinion contributed to non-interventionism. Roosevelt's national share of the 1940 presidential vote declined by seven percentage points from 1936. Of the 20 counties in which his share declined by 35 points or more, 19 were largely German-speaking. Of the 35 counties in which his share declined by 25 to 34 points, German was the largest or second-largest original nationality in 31. 

Non-interventionists rooted a significant portion of their arguments in historical precedent, citing events such as Washington's farewell address and the failure of World War I. "If we have strong defenses and understand and believe in what we are defending, we need fear nobody in this world," Robert Maynard Hutchins, President of the University of Chicago, wrote in a 1940 essay. Isolationists believed that the safety of the nation was more important than any foreign war.

As 1940 became 1941, the actions of the Roosevelt administration made it more and more clear that the United States was on a course to war. This policy shift, driven by the President, came in two phases. The first came in 1939 with the passage of the Fourth Neutrality Act, which permitted the United States to trade arms with belligerent nations, as long as these nations came to America to retrieve the arms, and pay for them in cash. This policy was quickly dubbed, 'Cash and Carry.' 

The second phase was the Lend-Lease Act of early 1941. This act allowed the President "to lend, lease, sell, or barter arms, ammunition, food, or any 'defense article' or any 'defense information' to 'the government of any country whose defense the President deems vital to the defense of the United States.'" American public opinion supported Roosevelt's actions.

After the attack on Pearl Harbor caused America to enter the war in December 1941, isolationists such as Charles Lindbergh's America First Committee and Herbert Hoover announced their support of the war effort. Isolationist families' sons fought in the war as much as others.

Non-interventionism after World War II 
Ohio Senator Robert A Taft was a leading opponent of interventionism after 1945, although it always played a secondary role to his deep interest in domestic affairs. Historian George Fujii, citing the Taft papers, argues:
Taft fought a mostly losing battle to reduce government expenditures and to curtail or prevent foreign aid measures such as the British loan of 1945 and the Marshall Plan. He feared that these measures would "destroy the freedom of the individual, freedom of States and local communities, freedom of the farmer to run his own farm and the workman to do his own job" (p. 375), thereby threatening the foundations of American prosperity and leading to a "totalitarian state" (p. 377).
In 1951, in the midst of bitter partisan debate over the Korean War, Taft increasingly spoke out on foreign policy issues. According to his biographer James T. Patterson:
Two basic beliefs continued to form a fairly consistent core of Taft's thinking on foreign policy. First, he insisted on limiting America's overseas commitments. [Taft said] "Nobody today can be an isolationist.... The only question is the degree to which we shall take action throughout the entire world." America had obligations that it had to honor – such as NATO – and it could not turn a blind eye to such countries as Formosa or Israel. But the United States had limited funds and problems at home and must therefore curb its commitments....This fear of overcommitment was rooted in Taft's even deeper faith in liberty, which made him shrink from a foreign policy that would cost large sums of money, increase the power of the military, and transform American society into what he called a garrison state.

Norman A. Graebner argues:
Differences over collective security in the G.O.P. were real in 1952, but Taft tried during his pre-convention campaign to moderate his image as a "go-it-aloner" in foreign policy. His whole effort proved unsuccessful, largely because by spring the internationalist camp had a formidable candidate of its own in Dwight D. Eisenhower. As the personification of post-1945 American commitment to collective security, particularly in Europe, General Eisenhower had decided to run because he feared, apparently, that Taft's election would lead to repudiation of the whole collective security effort, including NATO.

Eisenhower won the nomination and secured Taft's support by promising Taft a dominant voice in domestic policies, while Eisenhower's internationalism would set the foreign-policy agenda. Graebner argues that Eisenhower succeeded in moving the conservative Republicans away from their traditional attacks on foreign aid and reciprocal trade policies, and collective security arrangements, to support for those policies.  By 1964 the Republican conservatives rallied behind Barry Goldwater who was an aggressive advocate of an anti-communist internationalist foreign policy. Goldwater wanted to roll back Communism and win the Cold War, asking "Why Not Victory?"

Non-interventionism in the 21st century
During the presidency of Barack Obama, some members of the United States federal government, including President Obama and Secretary of State John Kerry, considered intervening militarily in the Syrian Civil War. A poll from late April 2013 found that 62% of Americans thought that the "United States has no responsibility to do something about the fighting in Syria between government forces and antigovernment groups," with only twenty-five percent disagreeing with that statement. 

A writer for The New York Times referred to this as "an isolationist streak," a characterization international relations scholar Stephen Walt strongly objected to, calling the description "sloppy journalism." According to Walt, "the overwhelming majority of people who have doubts about the wisdom of deeper involvement in Syria—including yours truly—are not 'isolationist.' They are merely sensible people who recognize that we may not have vital interests there, that deeper involvement may not lead to a better outcome and could make things worse, and who believe that the last thing the United States needs to do is to get dragged into yet another nasty sectarian fight in the Arab/Islamic world."

In December 2013, the Pew Research Center reported that their newest poll, "American's Place in the World 2013," had revealed that 52 percent of respondents in the national poll said that the United States "should mind its own business internationally and let other countries get along the best they can on their own." This was the most people to answer that question this way in the history of the question, one which pollsters began asking in 1964. Only about a third of respondents felt this way a decade ago.

A July 2014 poll of "battleground voters" across the United States found "77 percent in favor of full withdrawal from Afghanistan by the end of 2016; only 15 percent and 17 percent interested in more involvement in Syria and Ukraine, respectively; and 67 percent agreeing with the statement that, 'U.S. military actions should be limited to direct threats to our national security.'"

Conservative policies
Rathbun (2008) compares three separate themes in conservative policies since the 1980s: conservatism, neoconservatism, and isolationism. These approaches are similar in that they all invoked the mantle of "realism" and pursued foreign policy goals designed to promote national interests. Conservatives were the only group that was "realist" in the academic sense in that they defined the national interest narrowly, strove for balances of power internationally, viewed international relations as amoral, and especially valued sovereignty. 

By contrast, neoconservatives based their foreign policy on nationalism, and isolationists sought to minimize any involvement in foreign affairs and raise new barriers to immigration.
Former Republican Congressman Ron Paul favored a return to the non-interventionist policies of Thomas Jefferson and frequently opposed military intervention in countries like Iran and Iraq.

Supporters of non-interventionism

Politicians

 Justin Amash, former U.S. Representative from Michigan, 2020 Libertarian presidential candidate
 Eric Brakey, former U.S. State Senator from Maine, 2018 Republican U.S. Senate candidate
 Howard Buffett, U.S. Representative from Nebraska
 Calvin Coolidge, 30th U.S. President, 29th U.S. Vice President, 48th U.S. Governor of Massachusetts, 46th U.S. Lt. Governor of Massachusetts
 Tulsi Gabbard, former U.S. Representative from Hawaii (2013–2021)
 Mike Gravel, former US senator from Alaska (1969-1981), Entered the Pentagon Papers into Public Record in 1971, Democratic Presidential Candidate in 2008 and 2020. Founder of the Gravel Institute think tank
 Gary Johnson, 29th Governor of New Mexico (1995-2003), 2012 and 2016 Libertarian Presidential Nominee
 Thomas Massie, U.S. Representative from Kentucky
 Ron Paul, former U.S. Representative from Texas, 1988, 2008, & 2012 Republican presidential candidate; Paul's stance on foreign policy is one of consistent non-intervention, opposing wars of aggression and entangling alliances with other nations.
 Rand Paul, U.S. Senator from Kentucky, 2016 Republican presidential candidate, the son of Ron Paul
 Bernie Sanders, U.S. Senator from Vermont, 2016 and 2020 Democratic presidential candidate
 Henrik Shipstead, U.S. Senator from Minnesota, also a member of the America First Committee
 Robert A. Taft, U.S. Senator from Ohio, Senate Majority Leader, 1940, 1948 & 1952 Republican presidential candidate

Government officials

 Michael Scheuer, former CIA intelligence officer & former chief of the Bin Laden Issue Station, professor at Georgetown University, blogger, political commentator

Public figures

 Karen Kwiatkowski, retired Lt. Col. of the United States Air Force, 2012 Republican U.S. Representative candidate from Virginia, whistleblower from the Pentagon

Criticism

In his World Policy Journal review of Bill Kauffman's  1995 book America First! Its History, Culture, and Politics, Benjamin Schwartz described America's history of isolationism as a tragedy and being rooted in Puritan thinking.

See also  
Empire of Liberty
Interventionism
Ludlow Amendment
Little Englander
Open Door Policy
Vietnam War

Notes

References and further reading
 Adler, Selig. The Isolationist Impulse: Its Twentieth Century Reaction. (1957).; says it's based on economic self-sufficiency and the illusion of security, together with Irish and German ethnic factors. 
 Aregood, Richard, Richard Shafer, and Eric Freedman. "American Isolationism and The Political Evolution of Journalist-Turned-US Senator Gerald P. Nye." Journalism Practice 9.2 (2015): 279–294.
 Cole, Wayne S. America First: The Battle Against Intervention, 1940–1941 (1953), the standard history.
 Cooper, John Milton, Jr. The Vanity of Power: American Isolationism and the First World War, 1914–1917 (1969).
 Divine, Robert A. The Illusion Of Neutrality (1962) scholarly history of neutrality legislation in 1930s. online free to borrow 
 Doenecke, Justus D. "American Isolationism, 1939-1941" Journal of Libertarian Studies, Summer/Fall 1982, 6(3), pp. 201–216.
 Doenecke, Justus D. "Explaining the Antiwar Movement, 1939-1941: The Next Assignment" Journal of Libertarian Studies, Winter 1986, 8(1), pp. 139–162.
 Doenecke, Justus D. "Literature of Isolationism, 1972-1983: A Bibliographic Guide" Journal of Libertarian Studies, Spring 1983, 7(1), pp. 157–184.
 Doenecke, Justus D. "Anti-Interventionism of Herbert Hoover" Journal of Libertarian Studies, Summer 1987, 8(2), pp. 311–340.
 Doenecke, Justus D. "Non-interventionism of the Left: the Keep America Out of the War Congress, 1938-41." Journal of Contemporary History 12.2 (1977): 221–236.
 Dunn, David. "Isolationism revisited: seven persistent myths in the contemporary American foreign policy debate." Review of International Studies 31.02 (2005): 237–261.
 Fisher, Max. "American isolationism just hit a 50-year high. Why that matters." washingtonpost. com/blogs/worldviews/wp/2013/12/04/american-isolationism-just-hit-a-50-year-high-why-that-matters  Washington Post. Dec 12, 2013.  
 Gilbert, Felix. "The English Background of American Isolationism in the Eighteenth Century." William and Mary Quarterly: A Magazine of Early American History (1944): 138–160. in JSTOR
 Guinsburg, Thomas N. The Pursuit of Isolationism in the United States from Versailles to Pearl Harbor (1982).
 Johnstone, Andrew. "Isolationism and internationalism in American foreign relations." Journal of Transatlantic Studies 9.1 (2011): 7-20.
 Jonas, Manfred. "Isolationism" Encyclopedia of the New American Nation,"  online
 Jonas, Manfred. Isolationism in America, 1935-1941 (1966).
 Kertzer, Joshua D. "Making sense of isolationism: foreign policy mood as a multilevel phenomenon." Journal of Politics 75.01 (2013): 225-240.
 Kupchan, Charles A. Isolationism: A History of America's Efforts to Shield Itself from the World (Oxford University Press, 2020).

 Nichols, Christopher McKnight. Promise and Peril: America at the Dawn of a Global Age (Harvard University Press, 2011).
 Smith, Glenn H. Langer of North Dakota: A Study in Isolationism, 1940–1959 (1979). Senator William Langer 
 Weinberg, Albert K. "The Historical Meaning of the American Doctrine of Isolation." American Political Science Review'' 34#3 (1940): 539–547. in JSTOR

External links
 American isolationism and World War II

Criticism of neoconservatism
Non-interventionism
Old Right (United States)
Paleoconservatism
Paleolibertarianism
Political theories